Sun NXT is an Indian video on demand service run by Sun TV Network. It was launched in June 2017 and has content in six languages - Tamil, Telugu, Malayalam, Kannada, Bengali, Marathi . Sun NXT app is available for Android and iOS devices, Smart TVs and other devices.

History 
The service was launched in June 2017. Within four days of its launch, the app had obtained 1.1 million downloads. By November it was about seven million. In August 2019, Sun TV Network planned to invest  in the platform over 18 months. In February 2020, the platform's subscriber base grew to about 15 million users and started making profit. However, it had expected 20 million subscribers by the end of 2019. It has more than 4000+ Movies and 30+ Live TV Channels. Sun NXT despite not having two mil subscribers, the platform is approximately earning most of its revenue on the contractual basis of content sharing with partnership of network companies.

Content 
At the time of launch the platform had over 4000 movies, allowed live streaming of over 40 television channels and catch-up TV in four languages. Content available apart from TV and movies are news, comedy clips, originals and music. As of February 2020, it had 410+ shows and 4100+ movies.

There are three subscription plans offered for its users on monthly, quarterly and annual basis.

See also 

 List of streaming media services
 Over-the-top media service in India
 Video on demand
 Hotstar
 Netflix
 ZEE5
 ManoramaMax

References

External links 

 

Indian entertainment websites
Subscription video on demand services
Sun Group
Internet television streaming services
2017 establishments in Tamil Nadu
Video on demand services